Oberholzer is a town in West Rand District Municipality in the Gauteng province of South Africa. The town is 85 km south-west of Johannesburg, just north-west of Carletonville.

History
Laid out on the farm Wonderfontein, it was proclaimed in March 1939 and named after the owner of the farm, Hendrik Oberholzer.

The town of Oberholzer is situated in the constituency of Carletonville & there are no distinct boundaries separating Oberholzer from Carletonville. Together, they make one city.

References

Populated places in the Merafong City Local Municipality